The 1988 East Coast Conference men's basketball tournament was held March 5–7, 1988.  The champion gained and an automatic berth to the NCAA tournament.

Bracket and results

* denotes overtime game

All-Tournament Team
 Marty Johnson, Towson State
 Tommy Jones, Towson State
 Mike Polaha, Lehigh – Tournament MVP
 Daren Queenan, Lehigh
 Ron Simpson, Rider

Source

References

East Coast Conference (Division I) men's basketball tournament
Tournament